Tara Snyder (born May 26, 1977) is a former tennis player from the United States, who started a professional career in May 1995. She reached her highest individual ranking in the WTA Tour on November 16, 1998, when she was ranked No. 33 in the world. Snyder won the silver medal at the 1999 Pan American Games in Winnipeg, Manitoba, Canada, after losing the final to Venezuela's María Vento-Kabchi. Tara won the US Junior Open and was regarded as one of the top US youth tennis players of her time.

Tara Snyder's father Darrel Snyder was a tennis teaching instructor and taught her the game.  Tara's uncle Dave Snyder was the Texas Longhorns tennis coach for many years.

References

1977 births
Living people
American female tennis players
Pan American Games silver medalists for the United States
Sportspeople from Wichita, Kansas
Tennis people from Kansas
Tennis players at the 1999 Pan American Games
US Open (tennis) junior champions
Grand Slam (tennis) champions in girls' singles
Pan American Games medalists in tennis
Medalists at the 1999 Pan American Games
21st-century American women